The 1949 Arkansas State Indians football team represented Arkansas State College—now known as Arkansas State University—as a member of the Arkansas Intercollegiate Conference (AIC) during the 1949 college football season. Led by fourth-year head coach Forrest England, the Indians compiled an overall record of 5–4.

Schedule

References

Arkansas State
Arkansas State Red Wolves football seasons
Arkansas State Indians football